Chantiers Dubigeon was a shipyard established in 1760 by Julien Dubigeon in Nantes, France. In 1916 the heirs of Adolphe Dubigeon disagreed how to dispose of the company. Part of it was sold to Chantiers de la Loire and the rest was reorganized into the Anciens Chantiers Dubigeon which build a new yard on the Île de Nantes. In 1963 it was combined with La société Loire-Normandie, forming the Groupe Dubigeon-Normandie which was renamed Dubigeon-Normandie SA in 1969. It was acquired by Alsthom Atlantique in 1983, which closed the last shipyard in Nantes in 1987.

Bibliography

1760 establishments in France
Nantes
Shipyards of France
1963 disestablishments in France
French companies established in 1760